P.A.O. Kosmio F.C. is a Greek football club, based in Kosmio, Rhodope.

The club was founded in 1969. In 2013 they promoted for the first time in  Football League 2.

Football clubs in Eastern Macedonia and Thrace
Komotini
Association football clubs established in 1969
1969 establishments in Greece